Fatos Kongoli (born January 12, 1944) has recently become one of the most forceful and convincing representatives of contemporary Albanian prose.

Biography
He was born and raised in Elbasan and studied at the Qemal Stafa High School, in Tirana, Albania. Afterwards he studied mathematics in China during the tense years of the Sino-Albanian alliance. Kongoli chose not to publish any major works during the dictatorship. Rather than this, he devoted his creative energies at the time to an obscure and apolitical career as a mathematician, and waited for the storm to pass. His narrative talent and individual style only really emerged, at any rate, in the 1990s, since the fall of the communist dictatorship.

His first major novel, The Loser (I humburi, Tirana 1992; English edition, 2007), is set in March 1991, when over 10,000 refugees scrambled onto a decrepit and heavily rusting freighter to escape the past and to reach the marvelous West. There they washed up, unwanted, on the shores of southern Italy. At the last moment before setting sail, protagonist Thesar Lumi, the 'loser' for whom all hope is too late, abandons his companions, disembarks and walks home. "I returned to my neighbourhood at the nightfall. No one had seen me leave and no one saw me come back." The narrative of the novel returns at this point to the long and numbing years of the Hoxha dictatorship to revive the climate of terror and universal despair which characterized day-to-day life in Albania in the 1960s and 1970s. Thesar Lumi was born on the banks of a river (Alb. lumi) in the looming shadow of the people's own cement factory, which produced more dust than it ever did cement. Despite a skeleton in the family closet, an uncle who had earlier fled the country, Thesar manages to get himself registered at the university, and penetrates briefly into a milieu which is not his own and never will be, that of the ruling families of Albania's red aristocracy. "At a tender age I learned that I belonged to an inferior race or, as I saw things at the time, to a category of mangy dogs to be kicked about and chased away." Thesar, whose fate in Albania's hermetic and suffocating society has been sealed once and for all, returns to live a life of futility and despair in a universe with no heroes. Far from the active protagonist struggling to control of his own destiny or even from the staid positive hero of socialist realism, Thesar Lumi is incapable of action and incapable of living. He is the voice of all the 'losers' who glimpse the silver clouds on the horizon and know full well that they will never reach them. "My existence is that of the mediocre, setting out from nothing and going nowhere." When first published in 1992, in what was a comparatively large edition of 10,000 copies, the novel found immediate success among the reading public.

Among Kongoli's subsequent novels are: Kufoma, Tirana 1994 (The Corpse), the story of another loser caught up in the inhumane machinery of the last decade of the Stalinist dictatorship in Albania; Dragoi i fildishtë, Tirana 1999 (The Ivory Dragon), which focuses primarily on the life of an Albanian student in China in the 1960s; and Lëkura e qenit, Tirana 2003, a tale of love and forgotten affections. Kongoli's novels have been translated into French, German, Italian, Greek, Esperanto, Spanish and Slovak.

Sources 
Albanian literature from Robert Elsie

Books by Fatos Kongoli 
 Books by Fatos Kongoli gjemite e mbytura

References 

Albanian male writers
20th-century Albanian writers
21st-century Albanian writers
Albanian mathematicians
1944 births
Living people
Qemal Stafa High School alumni
People from Elbasan
Socialist realism writers